Bradley Ray Nessler (born June 3, 1956) is an American sportscaster, who currently calls college football and college basketball games for CBS Sports.

Career

Early assignments
Nessler began his professional broadcasting career sharing play–by–play radio duties with Al Ciraldo on Georgia Tech basketball on WGST from 1980–81 through 1984–85 and handled the play–by–play for the Atlanta Falcons from 1982 to 1988 on WGST and WSB before assuming the same position for the Minnesota Vikings during the 1988 and 1989 seasons. He also called preseason telecasts for the Miami Dolphins for several years and has done play–by–play of ACC football and basketball telecasts for Jefferson-Pilot.

CBS Sports
In 1990 and 1991, Nessler worked for CBS Sports, calling NFL games, college football and college basketball (both men's and women's college basketball).

ESPN and ABC Sports
Nessler's career with ESPN began in 1992 with college basketball games, and also Big Ten and Thursday night football contests, and expanded with the addition of ABC Sports assignments in 1997.

Nessler has also appeared annually as a commentator in EA Sports' NCAA Football series with Kirk Herbstreit. Also, his voice (and that of his broadcast partner, Dick Vitale) was featured in EA Sports' NCAA March Madness video game series.

College football
When Nessler began calling college football for ABC in 1997 he was regarded as the #3 play-by-play man behind Keith Jackson and Brent Musburger. He was promoted to #2 upon Jackson's scaling back to West Coast games in 1999, and was the #1 Saturday afternoon play-by-play man from 2006 until the 2008 season. In July 2009, ESPN announced that Nessler would move to the top play-by-play man for ESPN's coverage of college football, being primarily responsible for ESPN's Saturday Primetime game airing at 7:45 PM Eastern Time.

He originally worked with Gary Danielson as his college football color man when he began working for ABC in 1997, but from 1999 to 2008 called games alongside Bob Griese (who traded positions with Danielson). Starting in 2006, Paul Maguire joined Nessler and Griese as a third color commentator for the Saturday afternoon college telecasts.  Upon the announcement of Nessler's move to ESPN's Saturday Primetime telecasts, it was also announced that he would be teamed with former Penn State quarterback Todd Blackledge and sideline reporter Erin Andrews beginning with the 2009 college football season; this crew also called the January 1, 2010 Capital One Bowl on ABC.

NBA and college basketball
From 2002 to 2004, Nessler was a broadcaster for the NBA, including calling the 2003 NBA Finals. During this particular period, Nessler was accused (particularly by Richard Sandomir of The New York Times) of not knowing game strategy well, lacking rhythm and enthusiasm in his game call, not bringing out the best in his partners (i.e. Bill Walton and Tom Tolbert), too often ignoring the score, and tending to stammer.

Starting in 2006, Nessler had provided play-by-play for SEC games on Super Tuesday and Thursday Night Showcase, alongside Sean Farnham or Dick Vitale (and formerly Jimmy Dykes) and sideline reporter Heather Cox. He also covered Saturday afternoon games for ESPN during the regular college basketball season, and previously appeared on ABC.

Monday Night Football
On September 11, 2006, ESPN began its coverage of Monday Night Football with a Week 1 doubleheader. Nessler teamed with Ron Jaworski, Dick Vermeil, and Bonnie Bernstein to call the second game, featuring the San Diego Chargers and Oakland Raiders. On September 13, 2010, Nessler again worked a  Monday Night Football game, teaming with Trent Dilfer and Suzy Kolber to call the San Diego Chargers and Kansas City Chiefs in the second game of that night's Week 1 doubleheader. On September 12, 2011, Nessler and Dilfer called the Oakland Raiders and Denver Broncos in the second game of the Week 1 doubleheader; the game included a 63-yard field goal kicked by Oakland's Sebastian Janikowski, which tied the NFL record at the time.

NFL Network
In May 2011, Nessler was hired by NFL Network to call its Thursday Night Football telecasts, on which he was teamed with analyst Mike Mayock for an eight-game package. He continued to call the game package in 2012 and 2013, expanded to thirteen games, before CBS Sports took over responsibility for the package in the 2014 NFL season.

Return to CBS
CBS Sports announced on May 31, 2016 that Nessler would return to the network to serve as lead play-by-play announcer for SEC college football games beginning in the 2017 season, replacing the outgoing Verne Lundquist. He was then reunited with Danielson, who he worked with at ESPN and ABC from 1992–1999. Since 2022, the duo are joined weekly by Jenny Dell and former NFL referee Gene Steratore. He also provides play-by-play for college basketball for the network, usually teaming with analyst Bill Raftery.

Nessler's first SEC game for CBS was Florida at Arkansas on November 5, 2016. He assumed duties as CBS' lead college football announcer for the Sun Bowl one month later.

In 2018 Nessler called his first NCAA March Madness on TBS.

Personal life
Nessler is a graduate of Minnesota State University, Mankato. He now lives in the Atlanta area with his wife and family.

References

External links
 

1956 births
Living people
American radio sports announcers
American television sports announcers
Atlanta Falcons announcers
College basketball announcers in the United States
College football announcers
Georgia Tech Yellow Jackets basketball
Miami Dolphins announcers
Minnesota State University, Mankato alumni
Minnesota Timberwolves announcers
Minnesota Vikings announcers
National Basketball Association broadcasters
National Football League announcers
NFL Europe broadcasters
Olympic Games broadcasters
People from St. Charles, Minnesota
Women's college basketball announcers in the United States